Melanie B. Jacobs is an American legal scholar and administrator. She served as the interim dean of Michigan State University College of Law and was appointed 27th dean of the University of Louisville School of Law.

Biography 
Jacobs received her A.B. from Columbia University, her J.D. from Boston University, and LL.M. from Temple University. She joined Michigan State University College of Law's faculty in 2002 and served in a number of administrative positions. She served as interim dean from January 2020 to June 2021. She was appointed 25th dean of the University of Louisville School of Law in March 2022. She also taught at Temple University Beasley School of Law and Boston University School of Law.

Jacobs' scholarship focuses on family law and advocates for legal recognition of non-traditional families and changes to traditional parent-child relationships due to increased use of assisted reproductive technologies.

References 

Living people
Michigan State University faculty
University of Louisville faculty
Columbia College (New York) alumni
American women legal scholars
American legal scholars
Boston University School of Law alumni
Temple University Beasley School of Law alumni
American academic administrators
Year of birth missing (living people)